Malanje Sport Clube is an Angolan sports club from Malanje, the capital city of the namesake province.
The team currently plays in the Gira Angola.

Achievements
Angolan League: 0

Angolan Cup: 0

Angolan SuperCup: 0

Gira Angola: 0

Malanje provincial championship:  1 
 2015

League & Cup Positions

Manager history

Players

See also
Girabola

References

External links
 
 

Football clubs in Angola
Sports clubs in Angola